Communicate is a Canadian game show television series which aired on CBC Television from 1966 to 1967.

Premise
This series was inspired by the American game show Password. Each contestant attempted to determine the name of an object or person based on a single-word clue provided by a teammate. The game was played between two teams, each team consisting of two people where one of those people was a celebrity. The competing pair of teams played up to three rounds, where the winning team remained on the show to play a new team. Contestants who were not celebrities received cash prizes when they won.

Celebrity guests included Frances Hyland, Jane Morgan, Cliff Robertson, Jimmy Tapp, Bill and Marilyn Walker and Paxton Whitehead.

Tom Harvey hosted and moderated the game until December 1966 when he was replaced by Bill Walker.

Production
Communicate was produced in Montreal at the studios of CTV network affiliate CFCF-TV.

Scheduling
This half-hour series was broadcast weekdays at 4:00 p.m. (Eastern) from 3 October 1966 to 25 October 1967.

References

External links
 
 

CBC Television original programming
1960s Canadian game shows
1966 Canadian television series debuts
1967 Canadian television series endings
Television shows filmed in Montreal